Psachou (Greek: Ψάχου) is a neighbourhood in the city of Patras, Greece.  It is named after the doctor named Dimitris Psachou which he took place in the Balkan Wars and World War II who settled in the area.  It is located near Glafkos in Patras.

References
The first version of the article is translated and is based from the article at the Greek Wikipedia (el:Main Page)

Neighborhoods in Patras